The Prior of Loch Leven was the head of lands and of the community Augustinian canons of St Serf's Inch Priory, Loch Leven (a.k.a. Portmoak Priory). There was a Scottish Céli Dé (or Culdee) establishment there in the first half of the 12th century, allegedly found by Bruide, son of Dargart, King of the Picts (696–706). When the Augustinian priory was founded in 1150, the Scottish monks were absorbed into the established and those who refused to join were to be expelled. Not all of the priors are known. The most famous prior undoubtedly was the chronicler, Andrew de Wyntoun. Following more than four centuries of Augustinian monastic life and the resignation of the last prior, the Protestant king, James VI of Scotland, granted the priory to St Leonard's College, St Andrews.

Known abbots and priors

List of known Scottish abbots of St Serf's Inch
 Ronán, fl. mid-10th century
 Eógan, fl. 1128

List of known Augustinian priors of Loch Leven
 Roger, fl. 1183 x 1203-1212 x
 Simon, c. 1225-x 1235
 G. [...?], fl. 1235
 Laurence, fl. 1268
 Robert de Montrose, fl. 1386 x 1387
 David Bell, 1387–1390
 Thomas Mason, 1388–1389
 Andrew de Wyntoun, 1390–1421 
 James Biset, 1391–1394
 John Cameron, 1421
 Andrew Newton, 1423
 Robert Horsbruk, 1440–1460
 David Ramsay, 1462 x 1466
 Walter Monypenny, 1465–1500
 John Wylie, 1465
 Alexander Scrimgeour, 1483
 Thomas Kynor [Kinnear], 1486
 David Dickson, 1524–1525
 Michael Donaldson, 1524–1525
 John Winram, 1534
 David Guthrie, 1544–1558
 John Winram, 1552–1582

See also
 St Serf's Inch Priory

Notes

References
 Cowan, Ian B. & Easson, David E., Medieval Religious Houses: Scotland With an Appendix on the Houses in the Isle of Man, Second Edition, (London, 1976), p. 93
 Watt, D.E.R. & Shead, N.F. (eds.), The Heads of Religious Houses in Scotland from the 12th to the 16th Centuries, The Scottish Records Society, New Series, Volume 24, (Edinburgh, 2001), pp. 139–42

 *